The Colonial Development and Welfare Acts were a series of acts implemented by the British parliament.

Colonial Development Act 1929
Following the First World War, a group of European settlers emerged in Kenya, known as the Happy Valley set. Under the political guidance of Lord Delamere they sought to ensure that colonial policy suited the interests of these White settlers. However, with a certain amount of migration from the sub-continent of India, then under British rule, the racial exclusivity of the prime areas for settling came into dispute, and in 1923 Lord Devonshire issued the Devonshire Declaration.

Colonial Development and Welfare Act 1940
In 1942 the provisions of this act were used initially to fund the British Colonial Research Committee. Later the Colonial Social Science Research Council which was set up in 1944. The Act provided for £5mn per year for development and £500,000 per year for research.

Colonial Development and Welfare Act 1945
The 1946 Act provided a significant extension of the 1940 Act. The financing made available was increased to £120mn for all purposes to be spent between 1946 and 1956.

References

United Kingdom Acts of Parliament 1929
United Kingdom Acts of Parliament 1940
United Kingdom Acts of Parliament 1945